János Krizsán (born 21 October 1950) is a Hungarian equestrian. He competed in two events at the 1972 Summer Olympics.

References

External links
 

1950 births
Living people
Hungarian male equestrians
Olympic equestrians of Hungary
Equestrians at the 1972 Summer Olympics
People from Odžaci